Johnston's forest shrew (Sylvisorex johnstoni) is a species of mammal in the family Soricidae found in Burundi, Cameroon, the Central African Republic, the Republic of the Congo, the Democratic Republic of the Congo, Equatorial Guinea, Gabon, Rwanda, Tanzania, and Uganda. Its natural habitats are subtropical or tropical moist lowland and  montane forest.

References

Johnston's forest shrew
Mammals of the Republic of the Congo
Mammals of Rwanda
Mammals of Burundi
Mammals of Uganda
Mammals of Cameroon
Mammals of Gabon
Mammals of Equatorial Guinea
Taxonomy articles created by Polbot
Johnston's forest shrew